Salvatore Joseph Cordileone (born June 5, 1956) is an American prelate of the Catholic Church and the archbishop of Archdiocese of San Francisco in California since 2012.  He previously served as bishop of the Diocese of Oakland in California from 2009 to 2012 and as an auxiliary bishop of the Diocese of San Diego in California from 2002 to 2009.

A traditional theologian, he is known for his willingness to celebrate Mass in the Extraordinary Form of the Roman Rite (also known as Tridentine Mass). Cordileone has become known for his outspoken opposition to same-sex marriage.

Biography

Early life 
Salvatore Cordileone was born on June 5, 1956, in San Diego, California, and attended Crawford High School from 1971 to 1974. He then studied at San Diego State University for a year before entering the University of San Diego, earning a Bachelor of Philosophy degree in 1978. He then furthered his studies in Rome at the Pontifical Gregorian University, earning a Bachelor of Sacred Theology degree in 1981.

Priesthood 
Returning to California, Cordileone was ordained to the priesthood for the Diocese of San Diego by Bishop Leo Maher on July 9, 1982. He then served as an associate pastor at Saint Martin of Tours Parish in La Mesa, California, until 1985.  Cordileone then returned to the Gregorian University, where he earned a Doctor of Canon Law degree in 1989. Back in San Diego he was appointed as priest secretary to Bishop Robert Brom and a tribunal judge (1989–1990), adjutant judicial vicar (1990–1991), and pastor of Our Lady of Guadalupe Parish in Calexico, California (1991–1995).

In 1995, Cordileone went to Rome to work as an assistant at the Supreme Tribunal of the Apostolic Signatura, the highest judicial body in the Vatican under the pope. He was raised to the rank of chaplain of his holiness in 1999.

Auxiliary Bishop of San Diego 
On July 5, 2002, Cordileone was appointed as auxiliary bishop of the Diocese of San Diego and titular bishop of Natchesium by Pope John Paul II. He received his episcopal consecration on August 21, 2002, from Bishop Brom, with Bishops Raymond Burke and Gilbert Espinosa Chávez serving as co-consecrators.

Cordileone serves on the episcopal advisory board of the Institute for Religious Life at University of Saint Mary of the Lake in Mundelein, Illinois and St. Gianna Physician's Guild in San Diego Cordileone is considered to be theologically conservative. At the 2006 meeting of the U.S. Conference of Catholic Bishops (USCCB) in Baltimore, in the course of consideration of the document which issued as "Happy Are Those Who Are Called to His Supper" he proposed to the gathered bishops that the use of contraception should be included in a list of thoughts or actions constituting grave matter. The proposal was defeated, although a separate document approved at the meeting mentioned that the Catholic Church says that "contraception is objectively immoral."

Within the USCCB, Cordileone sat on the Bishops' and Presidents' Committee on Catholic Education from 2006 to 2009.

Bishop of Oakland

Cordileone was named the fourth bishop of the Diocese of Oakland by Pope Benedict XVI on March 23, 2009. Filling the vacancy left by Bishop Allen Vigneron's promotion to Archbishop of Detroit in January, Cordileone's relatively quick appointment was speculated to have been related to accusations that the diocese's interim administrator had blessed same-sex unions.  Cordileone's installation occurred on May 5, 2009, at the Cathedral of Christ the Light in Oakland.

On September 20, 2009, Cordileone offered a Pontifical High Mass (in Latin, Missa Pontificalis) at Saint Margaret Mary Church in Oakland. This was the first time a Tridentine Pontifical High Mass was offered in Northern California after the liturgical changes that followed the Second Vatican Council were finalized in 1969.

From 2011 to 2017, Cordileone served as chair of the USCCB Ad Hoc Committee for the Defense of Marriage (later renamed a subcommittee). working against the legalization of same-sex marriage. His mission was described by the USCCB as preserving the definition of marriage as the union between one man and one woman. In a June 2012 EWTN News interview, Cordileone stated that a redefinition of marriage to include LGBT couples would be bad for children, detrimental to society and dangerous for religious freedom.

Archbishop of San Francisco
On July 27, 2012, Pope Benedict XVI named Cordileone as archbishop of the Archdiocese of San Francisco. The appointment of Cordileone, and the acceptance of the resignation of his predecessor,  Archbishop George Niederauer, were both announced on July 27 in Washington, D.C., by Archbishop Carlo Maria Viganò, papal and apostolic nuncio to the United States. Cordileone was installed on October 4, 2012,  at the Cathedral of Saint Mary of the Assumption in San Francisco.

Drunk driving offense

Shortly before his installation as archbishop, on August 26, 2012, Cordileone was arrested for driving under the influence of alcohol at a police checkpoint in San Diego. His mother and a visiting priest from Germany were with him in the car. The arresting officer said that Cordileone "was a driver that was obviously impaired but he was quite cordial and polite throughout. He was not a belligerent drunk at all." Cordileone spent the night in custody. In a statement, he apologized and asked forgiveness the next day. He had been scheduled to appear in court on a misdemeanor charge of driving under the influence. However, Cordileone pleaded guilty to a reduced charge of reckless driving. Cordileone was subsequently given three years' probation and ordered to pay a fine. He was also required to attend a Mothers Against Drunk Driving victim-impact panel and a three-month first conviction program through the California Department of Motor Vehicles.

Call for replacement
In February 2015, Cordileone presented a statement to Catholic school teachers within his archdiocese saying Catholic school employees are expected to conduct their public lives in a way that does not undermine or deny the church's doctrine. Democratic California State Assemblymen Phil Ting of San Francisco and Kevin Mullin of San Mateo immediately wrote and made public a letter to Cordileone which was signed by every lawmaker representing the communities served by the four Catholic high schools in San Francisco, San Mateo and Marin counties, urging the archbishop to withdraw what they called "discriminatory morality clauses". Cordileone responded, saying he "respects the lawmakers' right to hire whoever may advance their mission and that he is asking for the same respect". Ting and Mulin then called for an investigation of working conditions at high schools administrated by the archdiocese, over the archbishop's proposed morality clauses for teachers.

On 16 April 2015, over 100 Catholic donors and church members from the Bay Area signed a full page advertisement in the San Francisco Chronicle appealing to Pope Francis to replace Cordileone as archbishop of the San Francisco archdiocese, specifically objecting to Cordileone's characterization of sex outside of marriage and LBGT relations as "gravely evil", saying Cordileone fosters "an atmosphere of division and intolerance". The archdiocese responded that the advertisement was a "misrepresentation of the spirit of the archbishop" and that it was also a misrepresentation to suggest the signers speak for the Catholic community in the Bay Area. In response to this advertisement categorized as "dissidents" in an op-ed piece from the San Mateo Daily Journal, over 7,500 letters of support were received from members of Cordileone's diocese, as well as from around the world. A subsequent picnic and show of support attended by hundreds of people was held on May 16, 2015, at Sue Bierman Park in San Francisco.

Chairman of the USCCB Committee on Laity, Marriage, Family Life, and Youth
On November 14, 2018, at the autumn General Assembly of the USCCB in Baltimore, there was a tie in the election to name a successor to Archbishop Charles Chaput of Philadelphia as chair of the Committee on Laity, Marriage, Family Life, and Youth. Cordileone and Bishop John Doerfler of Marquette each received 125 votes. Cordileone was declared the winner by virtue of being the senior bishop in consecration.

Opposition to LGBT rights

Same-sex marriage

A vocal opponent of gay rights and same-sex marriage, Cordileone helped in 2008 to draft Proposition 8, California's Constitutional amendment to define marriage as between one man and one woman, and raise substantial sums to pass it. He said, "Only one idea of marriage can stand ... If that's going to be considered bigoted, we're going to see our rights being taken away–as is already happening." In an interview with USA Today on March 21, 2013, concerning the US Supreme Court's then-pending decision on the constitutionality of Proposition 8, Cordileone argued against same-sex marriage, saying that it would harm children. Cordileone personally contributed $13,000 in support of Proposition 8.

In 2009, Cordileone was one of 17 United States bishops to sign the Manhattan Declaration: A Call of Christian Conscience, a document asserting opposition to same-sex marriage, abortion and assisted suicide, and to what signers feel is an infringement on freedom of religion.

Cordileone took part as a featured speaker in the June 2014 March for Marriage, a rally against same-sex marriage in Washington DC, which was attended by several hundred protestors. The event was organized by the National Organization for Marriage and its sponsors included: Concerned Women for America, The Family Leader, The Heritage Foundation, Human Life International, and the Family Research Council.

Before the event, at least 80 religious leaders and local and state lawmakers and officials (including the Mayor of San Francisco) collected a petition with 30,000 signatures and wrote publicly urging Cordileone not to take part in the event, which they saw as anti-LGBT.  They specifically objected to Cordileone "marching and sharing the podium with individuals who have repeatedly denigrated lesbian, gay, bisexual, and transgender people." House Speaker Nancy Pelosi, wrote privately urging him not to take part. Cordileone responded in a letter in which he said the march was not anti-LGBT or anti-anything, but pro-marriage.

LGBT employment discrimination
On 20 June 2014, jointly with other chairmen of committees within the USCCB, Cordileone also expressed concern over the reported intention of President Barack Obama to issue an executive order on LGBT employment, which would outlaw discrimination on the basis of sexual orientation and gender identity in enterprises with federal contracts. The chairs expressed concern that the order might oblige managers to violate their personal religious beliefs. The same three bishops published on 17 July 2014 a note explaining their opposition to the order and arguing that such a measure "is not about protecting persons, but behavior", and "uses the force of the law to coerce everyone to accept a deeply problematic understanding of human sexuality and sexual behavior and to condone such behavior".

Opposition to abortion 
On April 7, 2022, Cordileone warned Nancy Pelosi, the Speaker of the U.S. House of Representatives and a resident of San Francisco, in a letter that he would prohibit her from receiving Holy Communion unless she repudiated her promotion of abortion rights, stating, "A Catholic legislator who supported procured abortion, after knowing the teaching of the Church, commits a manifestly grave sin which is a cause of most serious scandal to others." On May 20, 2022, Cordileone notified her and publicly announced that he took that action.

The announcement came following the May 2022 Supreme Court leak suggesting that Roe v. Wade would be overturned and subsequent efforts by Congressional Democrats to codify abortion rights nationwide. Cordileone had previously objected to statements made by Pelosi in the summer of 2021 referring to herself as a "devout Catholic" during a news conference in which she expressed support for federal funding of abortions. He has also expressed support for denying communion to President Biden based on Biden's support for abortion rights. 

In his letter, Cordileone claimed that Pelosi has refused to communicate with him since her decision to support the Women's Health Protection Act in September 2021.

COVID-19 vaccination 
While Cordileone has advised Catholics to get vaccination for COVID-19, in a December 1, 2021, interview with the San Francisco Chronicle, Cordileone reported that he had not received a COVID-19 vaccination, that his "immune system is strong," and that his personal physician had told him that "it's probably not necessary" for him to be vaccinated. This disclosure led to parishioners of St. Agnes Church to request that Cordileone delay a planned visit to the church because he was not vaccinated.

Coat of arms
The coat of arms chosen by Cordileone has two sections. The upper part is a representation of his Italian surname Cor di leone, which means "lion's heart", and shows the top part of a lion rampant holding a red heart in its paws. The lower part shows a red crab, a reference to the crab-fishing occupation of the Cordileone family on its arrival in California and as a reference to a bishop's duty to be a "fisher of men". The motto, In verbo tuo, meaning "At your word" is a reference to the response of Peter, "At your word I will let down the nets", when invited by Jesus: "Put out into the deep and let down your nets for a catch".

See also

 Catholic Church hierarchy
 Catholic Church in the United States
 Historical list of the Catholic bishops of the United States
 List of Catholic bishops of the United States
 Lists of patriarchs, archbishops, and bishops

References

External links

Archbishop Cordileone, Archdiocese of San Francisco

Episcopal succession

 

1956 births
21st-century Roman Catholic archbishops in the United States
Anti-contraception activists
American anti-same-sex-marriage activists
Canon law jurists
Living people
People from San Diego
Pontifical Gregorian University alumni
Roman Catholic archbishops of San Francisco
San Diego State University alumni
University of San Diego alumni
Bishops appointed by Pope John Paul II